Karnali Blues is book written by Buddhi Sagar and published by FinePrint publication, Nepal in 2010. Karnali Blues is a story about a young boy who travels through different phases of his life with his parents. The story's main focus is on the protagonist's father. The book is one of the best selling Nepalese novel.

Synopsis

The novel depicts the father-son relationship in a family from Far-western region of Nepal. The novels begins with birth of Brisha Bahadur, the narrator of the novel. Brisha Bahadur narrates his father struggles. The novel is divided into eleven days. Brisha Bahadur is taking care of his father who is sick in those eleven days and he reminisces his past with his father.

Characters 

 Brisha Bahadur — Narartor and main protagonist of the book
 Harsha Bahadur — Brisha Bahadur's father
 Brisha Bahadur's mother
 Chandre — Brisha Bahadur's childhood friend
 Parvati — Brisha Bahadur's sister
 Mamata  — Parvati's friend

Translation 
This book was translated into English by Michael Hutt, a Professor of Nepali and Himalayan Studies at the School of Oriental And African Studies as Karnali Blues. The book was published by Penguin India on December 27, 2021 in Nepal, India, Pakistan, Bangladesh, Sri Lanka, Bhutan and Maldives.

See also 

 Seto Dharti 
 Faatsung 
 Loo

References

2010 novels
Nepalese novels
Novels set in Nepal
21st-century Nepalese novels
Nepalese books
2010 Nepalese novels
Nepalese bildungsromans
Nepali-language novels